18100 may refer to:

 British Rail 18100 - a prototype gas turbine-electric locomotive built for British Railways in 1951
 18100 Lebreton - a minor planet
 18,100 - a number